In the 1582 , Toyotomi Hideyoshi laid siege to Takamatsu Castle, which was controlled by the Mōri clan. He diverted a nearby river with dikes to surround and flood the castle. He also constructed towers on barges from which his gunmen could keep up a constant rate of fire and be unhindered themselves by the flooding.

Background
On the order of Oda Nobunaga, Hashiba Hideyoshi conquered Chūgoku region, and besieged Takamatsu  Castle, defended by Mori's vassal, Shimizu Muneharu, in Bitchu Province in the territory of the Mori clan.

Prelude
On April 17, 1582, Hideyoshi at last left Himeji Castle for Bitchu in his departure for the front with his 20,000 soldiers. On the way, he watched for the movement of the Ukita clan in Kameyama Castle, where the Ukita clan had resided, making sure that the Ukita clan would take sides with the Oda forces, and entered into Bitchu with 30,000-strong troops, with the addition of Ukita's 10,000 soldiers.

Siege
On May 17, the Hideyoshi forces besieged the Takamatsu castle with an army of as many as 30,000 troops, led by the Ukita forces. Though they attacked the castle two times, they lost in the face of counterattacks by castle garrisons.

As the battle grew more intense, the Takamatsu garrison received reinforcements from Mōri Terumoto, who brought an army two times larger than Hideyoshi's. Additionally, with the 40,000 support troops led by "Mori's Two Rivers" approaching, Hideyoshi dispatched a messenger to request aid from Oda Nobunaga, who had just defeated the Takeda clan in Kai Province, to send over support troops. In response, Nobunaga mobilized six of his commanders including Akechi Mitsuhide, whom he planned to lead the resultant army. But Nobunaga gave Hideyoshi  strict orders to conquer Takamatsu Castle as soon as possible. Later, Kuroda Yoshitaka offered an idea of using inundation tactics.

Adopting this tactic, Hideyoshi immediately started building an embankment, under the direction of Kuroda Yoshitaka, with support from Hachisuka Masakatsu, Ukita Tadaie, Horio Yoshiharu, Ikoma Chikamasa, Kuwayama Shigeharu, and Toda Masaharu. Meanwhile Asano Nagamasa and Konishi Yukinaga assembled boats and boatmen to make preparations for attacking the castle when it would be floating on a lake.

On June 8, which happened to be in the rainy season, the long-lasting rain swelled the Ashimori river, developing a lake and rendered Takamatsu Castle a solitary island. Takamatsu Castle was flooded by Hideyoshi and nearly fell. This made the provisions of rice for the garrison army decline by cutting their supply lines, and Mori's support troops were unable to move. In addition, Asano Nagamasa and Konishi Yukinaga were in charge of naval bombardment on the north side of the castle.

Mori decided to make peace with Hideyoshi. They sent Ankokuji Ekei, for Kuroda Yoshitaka to offer peace negotiations.

Aftermath
Hideyoshi soon learned of the Incident at Honnōji and the death of Nobunaga, which encouraged him to end the siege. Hideyoshi made peace overtures with Mori's, on the condition that Muneharu commit seppuku. Later, Shimizu Muneharu, the castle's commander, was forced to commit suicide in a boat on the artificial lake created by the flooding, in full view of both sides.

Cultural references
The siege is described and dramatized in the novel Taiko: An Epic Novel of War and Glory in Feudal Japan, written by Eiji Yoshikawa and translated to English by William Scott Wilson.

References

Turnbull, Stephen (2010). Toyotomi Hideyoshi (Command). Osprey Publishing.

1582 in Japan
Takamatsu 1582
Conflicts in 1582
Mōri clan
Takamatsu

Literature